The PWP Catch Division Championship is a professional wrestling championship owned by Pro Wrestling Pride. It was the first championship incorporated by Pro Wrestling Pride, and the company's second-tier championship behind the PWP Heavyweight Championship. Despite the championship being the secondary championship for the promotion, it has been known to main-event shows above the heavyweight championship.

The championship was established on the first Pro Wrestling Pride show under the company's banner on 13 May 2012, where Tyler Hawke defeated Wales' 'Wild Boar' Mike Hitchman. The design of the championship is that of a trophy rather than a traditional championship belt. Despite the championship being predominantly male, it has been won by a female. Bobbi Tyler won the championship for a single day in January 2017.

Catch Division Wrestling
Rather than a midcard title based on a weight (Such as All Japan Pro Wrestling's Junior Heavyweight Championship, or World Championship Wrestling's Cruiserweight championship), and is more in line with Total Nonstop Action Wrestling's X-Division Championship, which stated the division was 'not about weight limits, it's about no limits!" The catch division, was likely originally designed as a showcase of catch wrestling, rather than high-flying wrestling, with well known grapplers Johnny Kidd and Doug Williams winning the title.

However, the style has changed over the duration of the belt's life, with the aforementioned catch style, with a mix of luchador, Puroresu and even more 'extreme styles'. This is reflected in the match types contested for this championship, with "catch as catch can" wrestling style (See Mountevans Rules), Luchas de Apuestas and even TLC matches. The division's prize was a catch division trophy, and not a traditional belt.

Title history 
The full history of the championship is listed below. As the championship is currently on hiatus; the current championship reign of Tyler Hawke is being accumulated; however, it may not be accurate.

Combined reigns 

See also
 Catchweight
 List of professional wrestling promotions in the Great Britain and Ireland
 Pro Wrestling Pride

Notes

References

External links 
 Pro Wrestling Pride official website
 Pro Wrestling Pride official Facebook Page
 Pro Wrestling Pride official Twitter account
 wrestling-titles.com
 solie.org (title histories)
 Wrestling Information Archive

Professional wrestling in the United Kingdom
X Division championships